Amphinecta is a genus of South Pacific intertidal spiders first described by Eugène Simon in 1898.

Species
 it contains eleven species, all found in New Zealand:
Amphinecta decemmaculata Simon, 1898 – New Zealand
Amphinecta dejecta Forster & Wilton, 1973 – New Zealand
Amphinecta luta Forster & Wilton, 1973 – New Zealand
Amphinecta mara Forster & Wilton, 1973 – New Zealand
Amphinecta milina Forster & Wilton, 1973 – New Zealand
Amphinecta mula Forster & Wilton, 1973 – New Zealand
Amphinecta pika Forster & Wilton, 1973 – New Zealand
Amphinecta pila Forster & Wilton, 1973 – New Zealand
Amphinecta puka Forster & Wilton, 1973 – New Zealand
Amphinecta tama Forster & Wilton, 1973 – New Zealand
Amphinecta tula Forster & Wilton, 1973 – New Zealand

References

Araneomorphae genera
Desidae
Spiders of New Zealand
Taxa named by Eugène Simon